Ebenezer Mission, also known as Wimmera mission, Hindmarsh mission and Dimboola mission, was a mission station for Aboriginal people established near Lake Hindmarsh in Victoria, Australia (near Jeparit) in 1859 by the Moravian Church on the land of the Wotjobaluk. The first missionaries were two Germans, Reverend Friedrich Hagenauer and Reverend F.W. Spieseke (c. 1821–1877). In 1861 the Victorian Colonial Government gazetted  as a reserve for the Ebenezer Mission Station. The mission was established a few years after the failure of the Moravian Lake Boga mission in Wemba-Wemba territory.

Horatio Cockburn Ellerman, an early settler who established Antwerp Station, suggested the site where the mission station was established rather than the three sites suggested by the Government. The site selected was known as "Banji bunag", and had traditional meaning for the  Wotjobaluk, being a corroboree ground according to elder Uncle Jack Kennedy, and also contained the grave for an Aboriginal woman shot dead, the mother of William Wimmera.

The main aim of the mission was to "civilise" and Christianise the Aboriginal inhabitants of the area. In 1860, the first convert to Christianity, Nathanael Pepper, was baptised. Rations were given to residents on the condition that they attended church services and school.

As a result of the Half-Caste Act 1886 which forced "half-caste" Aboriginal people off missions, by 1892 the number of residents at Ebenezer Mission Station had dropped to only 30 people.

In 1902 the State Government of Victoria decided to close the Ebenezer Mission due to low numbers. The mission closed in 1904, and most of the land was handed back to the Victorian Lands Department and made available for selection in 1905.

In the following twenty years, many Wergaia people were forcibly moved to Lake Tyers Mission in Gippsland under police escort, along with closure of all rations to Ebenezer Mission and seizure of children. Despite these measures, some Wergaia families avoided relocation and remained on their ancestral lands.

See also
Lake Condah Mission

References

Further reading
 – very detailed overview.

 Blake, Leslie James (1967); "Education at Ebenezer"; The Education Magazine; Vol 24, No 1; Feb 1967, pp 37–48
 Brown, Anne (1992); "Ebenezer Dreaming"; Site; no 13; pp 12–14
 Christie, MF (1979); Aborigines in Colonial Victoria, 1835-86; University of Sydney Press, Sydney.
 Clark, ID (1990); Aboriginal Languages and Clans; An Historical Atlas of Western and Central Victoria, 1800-1900; Monash Publications in Geography, Melbourne
 Edwards, Bill (1999); Moravian Aboriginal Missions in Australia 1850-1919; Adelaide
 Fels, Marie Hansen (1998); A History of the Ebenezer Mission; Melbourne
 Harris, J (1994); One Blood: 200 Years of Aboriginal Encounter with Christianity: a Story of Hope; Albatross Books, Sutherland
 Jensz, Felicity (2008); "Imperial critics: Moravian missionaries in the British colonial world"; in Evangelists of Empire? Missionaries in Colonial History; Amanda Barry, Joanna Cruickshank, Andrew Brown-May and Patricia Grimshaw (eds), University of Melbourne eScholarship Research Centre, Melbourne.
 Jensz, Felicity (2001); Missionaries: Ebenezer Mission, 1859-1904, near Antwerp, western Victoria.
 Longmire, A (1985), Nine Creeks to Albacutya: a History of the Shire of Dimboola; Hargreen Publishing and Shire of Dimboola, Melbourne
 Lydon, Jane (2009); Fantastic Dreaming: the Archaeology of an Aboriginal Mission; AltaMira Press, Maryland USA
 Massola, Aldo (1970); "History of Ebenezer Mission Station"; Aboriginal Mission Stations in Victoria; The Hawthorn Press (Melbourne); pp 31–62
 Massola, Aldo (1966); The Aborigines of the Mallee; Melbourne
 McKenzie, Janet (1983); Ebenezer; Blackwood
 Rhodes, David (1998); An Archaeological Report on the Ebenezer Mission Station; Melbourne
 Robertson, Susan (1988); "Nathaniel Pepper of Ebenezer, Chapter 1: Ebenezer is Founded"; The Aim; Vol 22, No 2; pp 6–7
 Robertson, Susan (1992); The Bell Sounds Pleasantly: Ebenezer Mission Station; Doncaster; (Revised Edition)
 Werner, A.B. (1964); Early Mission Work at Antwerp; 2.Ed; Dimboola

Aboriginal communities in Victoria (Australia)
Australian Aboriginal missions
Wergaia
1859 establishments in Australia
Victorian Heritage Register
Victorian Heritage Register Grampians (region)
Shire of Hindmarsh